Freddie Maake is a South African football fan who is the president of the South African National Supporters (SANASU) and has claimed to be the inventor of the vuvuzela instrument.

Career

Maake is nicknamed "Saddam" after former Iraqi dictator Saddam Hussein. He has claimed to have invented of the vuvuzela instrument in 1965. He has been a supporter of Kaizer Chiefs since their formation in 1970. 

Maake started attending South Africa national soccer team games in 1992. He is president of the South African National Supporters (SANASU).

Personal life

He has fifteen children and has divorced three times.

References

Living people